SN 2005cs was a supernova in the spiral galaxy M51, known as the Whirlpool Galaxy. It was a type II-P core-collapse supernova, discovered June 28, 2005 by Wolfgang Kloehr, a German amateur astronomer. Based on the data, the explosion was inferred to occur 2.8 days before discovery. It was considered under-luminous for a supernova of its type, releasing an estimated  in energy.

The progenitor star was identified from a Hubble Space Telescope image taken January 20–21, 2005. A higher mass star enshrouded in a cocoon of dust has been ruled out.

References

External links
 Light curves and spectra on the Open Supernova Catalog
 
 

Supernovae
Canes Venatici
20050628
2005 in science